Events in the year 2011 in Moldova.

Incumbents
President: Marian Lupu (Acting President)
Prime Minister: Vlad Filat

Events
 17 April – Action 2012, a coalition of organizations supporting unification between Moldova and Romania, is founded.
 Moldovan local election, 2011
 Moldovan presidential election, 2011
 Chișinău Independence Day Parade, 2011

Arts and entertainment
Music: Moldova in the Eurovision Song Contest 2011.

Sports
Soccer competitions: Moldovan National Division, Moldovan "A" Division, Moldovan Cup.

Deaths

References

 
Moldova
Years of the 21st century in Moldova